Syllepte vagans, the leaden pearl, is a moth in the family Crambidae. It was described by Tutt in 1890. It is found in South Africa, Botswana, the Democratic Republic of Congo, Kenya, Mozambique, Namibia, Nigeria, Tanzania, Zambia and Zimbabwe. It is recorded infrequently in the Great Britain through accidental import.

References

Moths described in 1890
Moths of Africa
vagans